"Let You Down" is a song by Australian electronic music duo Peking Duk featuring Swedish duo Icona Pop. The song was released on 13 October 2017 and has peaked at number 37 on the Australian ARIA Singles Chart. For the first time, the song features the vocals of one of Adam Hyde from Peking Duk.

Peking Duk described the song as a "modern heartbreak anthem" and say it was inspired by the 2006 film, Candy, with the story being told from Heath Ledger's perspective.

At the APRA Music Awards of 2019, the song was nominated for Dance Work of the Year.

Track listing

Charts

Certifications

References

Peking Duk songs
Icona Pop songs
2017 singles
2017 songs
Sony Music Australia singles